New, Rare, Live is a 2004 compilation album by the Australian band Superheist. It includes the band's final recorded songs with earlier songs and live recordings of the group's final concert at Melbourne in 2003.

Background 

In mid 2003 Superheist began working on their third studio album. However, after a turbulent second half of the year touring, loss of management and an eventual disastrous band breakup, the album was never completed. There were however four new tracks completed featuring Joey Biro on vocals ("Seasons, Get A Life, Vultures and Hole in the Head") and an additional single, "The Road", with Cam Baines of Bodyjar on lead vocals. These five tracks were later released with a bunch of B-sides from Supeheist's back catalog and this became disc 1 of New, rare, Live. The second CD of the compilation was originally meant to be a stand-alone live release; however, due to the band split it became part of this compilation.

Track listing
AUS Double CD SHOCK7034
Disc 1  – New.Rare. 
"The Road (Ft. Cam Baines)" – 2:20
"Seasons" – 4:09
"Get A Life" – 3:56
"Vultures" – 3:05
"Hole in the Head" – 4:41
"Ready To Burn" – 2:43
"8 Miles High" – 4:12
"Label" – 2:52
"Pocket Full of Lies" – 3:42
"Times Killing" – 3:04
Disc 2 – Live.'
"Untitled Medley" [Hayley Katoma] – 3:53
"Liberate" – 2:45
"Empire" – 3:07
"Step Back" – 3:13
"Two Faced (Check Your Head Up)" – 3:17
"The Hollow Blue" – 4:01
"7 Years" – 2:57
"Slide" – 4:10
"Bullet" – 4:21
"Beaming Down From Satellites" – 4:43
"Scars" – 3:12
"The Ghost" – 4:31
"Pulse" – 4:12

Personnel 

New.Rare
 Richard William "D W" Norton – guitar, backing vocals (all tracks) bass (tracks 1–5) 
 Sean Pentecost – drums (all tracks)
 Fetah Sabawi – synthesisers, samplers (all tracks)
 Drew Dedman – bass guitar (track 6)
 Simon Durrant – bass guitar (track 7–10)
 Cam Baines – lead vocals (track 1)
 Joey Biro – lead vocals (tracks 2–6)
 Rod McLeod – lead vocals (tracks 7–10)

Live
 Richard William "D W" Norton – lead guitar, backing vocals, producer on all tracks
 Drew Dedman – bass guitar
 Sean Pentecost – drums
 Fetah Sabawi – synthesisers, samplers
 Joey Biro – lead vocals

Superheist albums
2004 compilation albums
Shock Records albums
2004 live albums
Shock Records live albums